Skorokhod's theorem may refer to:

 Skorokhod's embedding theorem
 Skorokhod's representation theorem

See also 
 List of things named after Anatoliy Skorokhod